The Garnet Bracelet is a 1964 Soviet drama film directed by Abram Room.

Plot 
A Russian official falls in love with a young lady, but she does not reciprocate.

Cast 
 Ariadna Shengelaia as Vera Nikolayevna (as Ariadna Shengelaya)
 Igor Ozerov as Zheltkov
 Oleg Basilashvili as Vasily Lvovitch
 Vladislav Strzhelchik as Nikolai Nikolayevich
 Natalya Malyavina as Anna Nikolayevna (as N. Malyavina)
 Yuri Averin as Von Friesse (as Yu. Averin)
 Olga Zhizneva as Mme. Zarzhitskaya
 Leonid Gallis as Anosov

References

External links 
 

1964 films
1960s Russian-language films
Soviet drama films
1964 drama films